AfterShock Comics is an American comic book publisher. These are the ongoing and limited series publications it has released.

Titles

0–9 

 10 Years to Death (2021), #1 (one shot)
 2016 Aftershock Retailer Preview (2016)

A 

 AfterDark (2021), #1 (one shot; see Tales of Mother F. Goose)
 AfterShock Genesis (2016), #1
 Almost American (2021–2022), #1–5
Alters (2016), #1–10
 American Monster (2016–2017), #1–6
 Animosity (2016–2020), #1–28
 Animosity: Evolution (2017–2019), #1–10
 Animosity: The Rise (2017), #1–3
 The Art of Jim Starlin
 Artemis and the Assassin (2020), #1–5
 Astronaut Down (2022), #1–5

B 

 Babyteeth (2017–2021), #1–20
 Backways (2017–2018), #1–5
 Bad Reception (2019), #1–5
 Betrothed (2018) (2018), #1–5
 Beyonders (2018–2019), #1–5
 The BeQuest (2021), #1–4
 Beyond the Breach (2021), #1–5
 Black-Eyed Kids (2016–2017), #1–15
 Black-Eyed Kids Black & White Halloween Special (2016), #1
 Blood Blister (2017), #1–2
 I Breathed a Body (2021), #1–5
 Brilliant Trash (2017–2018), #1–6
 Brothers Dracul (2018), #1–5
 Bunny Mask (2021), #1–4
 Bylines in Blood (2022–), #1–

C 

 A Calculated Man (2022), #1–4
 Campisi: The Dragon Incident (2021), #1–4
 Captain Kid (2016), #1–2
 Chicken Devil (2021–2022), #1–4
 Clankillers (2018), #1–5
 Clans of Belari (2021), #1–4
 Cold War (2018), #1–5
 Cross to Bear (2021–2022), #1—4

D 

 Dark Ark (2017–2019), #1–15
 Dark Ark: After the Flood (2019–2020), #1–5
 Dark Red (2019–2020), #1–10
 Dark Red: Where the Road Leads (2022), #1 (one shot)
 Dead Day (2020), #1–5
 Dead Kings (2018–2019), #1–5
 Descendant (2019), #1–5
 Disaster Inc. (2020), #1–5
 Dreaming Eagles (2015–2016), #1–6

E 

 Eden (2021), #1 (one shot)
 Eleanor and the Egret (2017), #1–5

F 

 Fu Jitsu (2017–2018), #1–5

G 
 Girls of Dimension 13 (2021), #1–5
 Godkillers (2020), #1–5
 God of Tremors (2021), #1 (one shot)

H 

 Heathens (2021–2022), #1–5
 Hell is a Squared Circle (2022), #1
 Her Infernal Descent (2018), #1–5
 Hot Lunch Special (2018–2019), #1–5

I 

 I Breathed a Body (2021), #1–5
 Insexts (2015–2016), #1–13

J 

 Jackpot! (2016–2017), #1–6
 Jimmy's Bastards (2017–2018), #1–9
 Join the Future (2020), #1–5

K 
 Kaiju Score (2020–Present), #1–4
 KAIJU SCORE - Steal From The Gods
 Killer Groove (2019), #1–5
 Knights Temporal (2019–2020), #1–5
 Knock Em Dead (2020–2021), #1–5

L 

 Land of the Living Gods (2022), #1–5
 The Last Space Race (2018–2019), #1–5
 Lollipop Kids (2018–2019), #1–5
 Lonely Receiver (2020–2021), #1–5
 Lost City Explorers (2018), #1–5
 The Lion and the Eagle (2022), #1–4

M 

 Maniac of New York v1 (2021), #1–5
 Maniac of New York v2: The Bronx is Burning (2021–2022), #1–4
 The Man Who F#&%ed Up Time (2020), #1–5
 Mary Shelley: Monster Hunter (2019), #1–5
 Midnight Rose (2022), #1
 Midnight Vista (2019–2020), #1–5
 Miles to Go (2020–2021), #1–5
 Miskatonic (2020–2021), #1–5
 Miskatonic: Even Death May Die (2021), #1
 Monstro Mechanica (2017–2018), #1–5
 Moth & Whisper (2018–2019), #1–5
 My Date with Monsters (2021–2022), #1–5

N 

 Naughty List (2022), #1–4
 The Normals (2017), #1–6
 Nuclear Family (2021), #1–5

O 

 Oberon (2019), #1–5
 The Ocean will Take Us (2022), #1–5
 Orphan Age (2019), #1–5
 Out of Body (2021), #1—5

P 

 Patience! Conviction! Revenge! (2018–2019), #1–5
 Pestilence (2017–2018), #1–6
 Pestilence: A Story of Satan (2018), #1–5
 Piecemeal (2021), #1 (one shot)
 Phantom on the Scan (2021), #1–5
 Project Patron (2021), #1–5

Q

R 

 Red Atlantis (2020–2021), #1–5
 Relay (2018–2019), #1–5
 Replica (2015–2016), #1–5
 The Revisionist (2016), #1–6
 Rough Riders (2016), #1–7
 Rough Riders Nation (2016), #1
 Rough Riders: Riders on the Storm (2017), #1–6
 Rough Riders: Ride or Die (2018), #1–4

S 

 Scout's Honor (2021), #1-5
 Search for Hu (2021–2022), #1–5
 Second Sight (2016), #1–6
 Seven Swords (2021), #1–
 Shadow Doctor (2021), #1–5
 Shipwreck (2016–2018), #1–6
 Shoplifters will be Liquidated (2019–2020), #1–5
 Silver City, (2021), #1–5
 Spectro (2022), #1
 Strayer (2016), #1–5
 Stronghold (2019), #1–5
 Superzero (2015–2016), #1–6
 Sympathy for No Devils (2020–2021), #1–5

T 
 Tales of Mother F. Goose (2021), #1 (continues from AfterDark)
 Trust Fall (2019), #1
 There's Something Wrong with Patrick Todd (2022–2023), #1–5

U 

 Undone by Blood (2020), #1–5
 Undone by Blood or The Other Side of Eden (2021), #1–4
 Unholy Grail (2017), #1–5

V 

 The Vineyard (2022–2023), #1–4
 Volition (2018–2019), #1–6

W 

 A Walk Through Hell (2018–2019), #1–12
 A Walk Through Hell: Halloween Edition (2018), #1
 We Live v1 (2020–2021), #1–5
 We Live v2: Age of the Palladions (2022), #1–5
 World of Animosity (2017), #1
 World Reader (2017), #1–6

X

Y 

 You Are Obsolete (2019–2020), #1–5

Z

Graphic novels 
 All My Little Demons (2020), a Cullen Bunn omnibus collection.
 Horde (2019)
 Kill a Man (2020)
 The Replacer (2019)
 Shock (2018)
 Shock Volume 2 (2019)
 Out of the Blue (2019)
 Witch Hammer (2018)

References

External links 

Aftershock Comics series

Aftershock Comics